Leah McNamara is an Irish actress. She starred in the film Metal Heart (2018) and the Sky Max thriller Then You Run (2023). She also appeared in the History series Vikings (2017–2019), the BBC One–RTÉ crime drama Dublin Murders (2019), and the BBC Three–Hulu miniseries Normal People (2020).

Early life and education
McNamara is from County Limerick. She attended Castletroy College. She graduated with an honours degree in Drama and Theatre from University College Cork in 2015 and then enrolled in the year-long acting programme at Bow Street.

Filmography

Film

Television

References

External links

Living people
21st-century Irish actresses
Actresses from County Limerick
Alumni of University College Cork
Alumni of the Bow Street Academy
Irish television actresses
People educated at Castletroy College
Year of birth missing (living people)